Zodiac is the seventh studio album by electronic rock band Electric Six. It was released in 2010 on Metropolis Records.

According to an official statement by the band, the songs on the album have been arranged to correspond with the signs of the Zodiac. The album contains a cover version of The Spinners 1976 classic "The Rubberband Man".

Track listing

A bonus edition was released online via iTunes and Amazon download.

Personnel
 Dick Valentine - vocals
 Tait Nucleus? - synthesizer
 The Colonel - guitar
  - guitar
 Percussion World - drums
 Smörgåsbord - bass
 Timothy Monger - accordion, fiddle (track 1)
 Dave Malosh - harp (track 1), guitar (track 2)
 Christian Doble - saxophone (tracks 2, 5, 6, 10)
 Amy Gay - background vocals (tracks 3, 7)
 Jesse "Boots Electric" Hughes - background vocals (track 3)
 Kristin von B. - background vocals (tracks 3, 6, 12)
 Jaxxon Smith - guitar (track 3)
 John R. Dequindre - turntables (tracks 3, 12)
 Aja Sardis - background vocals (track 5)
 Ron Zakrin - synthesizer (tracks 6, 8)
 Reuben Wu - synthesizer, hihat (track 9)
 Matthew Smith - background vocals (track 10)
 Fred Thomas - background vocals (track 11)

Production
 The album's title was inspired by the song "Typical Sagittarius", which the band wrote for the album, but chose not to include in the final cut. Other songs recorded but left off of the finished album include "I Can Translate" which was released as a B-Side on the limited "Jam It in the Hole" single and as a bonus track on European iTunes downloads of the album. The band also recorded a cover of "The Warrior" by Scandal which they originally planned to make available as a free internet download. It was ultimately included on their 2015 compilation album Mimicry and Memories.
 Although the album cover was presumed by some to be a photo of lead singer Dick Valentine, it is in fact a stock photo that was licensed for use as the album cover.

Trivia
 As with the band's previous album KILL, 3 tracks on the album are exactly 4:20 in length. However, there is only one track with this length on the band's next album, Heartbeats and Brainwaves.
 The title of the song "Doom and Gloom and Doom and Gloom" is a reference to lyrics featured in the track "I Don't Like You" from the band's 2007 album I Shall Exterminate Everything Around Me That Restricts Me from Being the Master. The sax solo also references Gerry Rafferty's Baker Street.

Legacy
 The band performed "Jam It in the Hole" on their first live album "Absolute Pleasure".
 The band performed "Clusterfuck!" and "Jam It in the Hole" in their live concert movie "Absolute Treasure".
 The album's cut song, "Typical Saggitarius" and bonus edition song, "I Can Translate" were included on the band's second compilation album, "Mimicry and Memories", along with a cover of "The Warrior" by Scandal recorded during this album's sessions.
 Dick Valentine later recorded an acoustic version of "Doom and Gloom and Doom and Gloom" for inclusion on his solo album "Quiet Time".
 A demo version of "I Can Translate" was subsequently released on "The Dick Valentine Raw Collection".
 The band performed "After Hours" and "Countdown to the Countdown" on their second live album "You're Welcome!".

References

Electric Six albums
Metropolis Records albums
2010 albums